Pobisk Georgievich Kuznetsov (May 18, 1924, Krasnoyarsk - December 4, 2000) was a Soviet Russian philosopher and scientist. Doktor nauk, Professor. He was professor at the Moscow Institute of Physics and Technology and Dubna State University (Moscow region, Dubna city, Russia).
He worked for the State Duma of the Russian Federation.

During the war he became a Junior lieutenant.
He was awarded the Order of the Red Star. He was injured. He suffered from Stalin's repression. In 1958 he graduated. From 1961 to 1964 he is a postgraduate student at the V. I. Lenin Moscow State Pedagogical Institute. He defended his dissertation for the kandidat degree in 1965. He worked at the V. I. Lenin Moscow State Pedagogical Institute. Since 1974 he worked at the Moscow Power Engineering Institute. Then he worked at Moscow Institute of Physics and Technology.

He was the author of 200 scientific papers.

He influenced Evald Ilyenkov, with whom he was close friends in the 1950s.

He was also awarded the Order of the Patriotic War in 1985, the Medal "For Distinguished Labour" in 1969.

References

External links
 Was the “Special Period” a Cuban Invention? // Havana Times, November 19, 2016.

20th-century Russian scientists
Academic staff of the Moscow Institute of Physics and Technology
1924 births
2000 deaths
Energy economists